Lu Yin may refer to:

Lu Yin (Three Kingdoms) ( 3rd century), Eastern Wu official of the Three Kingdoms period
Lü Yin (712–762), Tang dynasty official
Lu Yin (writer) (1899–1934), Chinese writer

See also
Yin Lu (born 1989), Chinese footballer, known as Lu Yin in the Western name order